The Mississippi Legislature met in multiple sessions in the 2012-2016 term. They were from: January 3-May 3, 2012; January 8 - April 4, 2013; April 26, 2013; June 27–28, 2013; January 7-April 6, 2014; May 8, 2014; and January 6-April 5, 2015.

Officers

Senate

Presiding Officer

House of Representatives

Presiding Officer

Composition 
The following composition reflects the balance of power after the 2011 elections, which was the first election since Reconstruction to give a majority of seats in the State House to the Republicans.

House

Senate

House 

With the February 2009 party switch of Billy Nicholson from Democrat to Republican, the composition became 73 Democrats and 49 Republicans. This also meant that for the first time in the history of Mississippi, the majority of the Democratic members of the House were African-Americans.

Notes

References 

Mississippi legislative sessions
Mississippi Legislature 2012-2016